Barsingar power station project is a 250-megawatt (MW) lignite based power station operated by NLC India Limited, formerly Neyveli Lignite Corporation (NLC), located at Barsingsar in Bikaner district, Rajasthan, India.

Background
The first 125 MW was commissioned on 28 June 2010. The second 125 MW was commissioned on 25 January 2011.

Lignite for the power project is being supplied from the Barsingsar Mine, which is owned and operated by NLC. The mine was commissioned in October 2009.

Delays
The company was subject to a financial crunch as a result of delays in commissioning the plant. The first unit was commissioned in 2010, but it was reported that as of October 2011 the unit had not reached its target output. In its July 2010 annual report, NLC stated that the second unit was scheduled to be commissioned in September 2010, but the second 125 MW was commissioned on 25 January 2011, and a media report in late 2011 stated that "the modification works for the second unit are progressing very slowly." The media report also said the station contractor BHEL was "failing to keep its commitment that it will commence commercial operations of the Barsingar thermal power project by end of September 2011." the thermal plant declared for commercial operation during Jan. 2012, while Unit-I was declared during December 2011.

References

External resources

 "Barsingsar Lignite Power Plant", Global Energy Observatory, accessed January 2012.

Coal-fired power stations in Rajasthan
Buildings and structures in Bikaner district
2011 establishments in Rajasthan
Energy infrastructure completed in 2011